Academy of Tucson is a public charter school in Tucson, Arizona. In 1986, it was founded as a private high school. It became a charter school in 1999 and added the elementary and middle schools in 2003. The school has three campuses; elementary, middle, and high school located on the East side of Tucson. Wendi Allardice is the district Superintendent. Academy of Tucson High School is consistently ranked as one of the best public high schools in the city by U.S. News & World Report. Academy of Tucson has an approximately 14:1 student to teacher ratio and a 100% graduation rate.

References

Public high schools in Arizona
Charter schools in Arizona
Public elementary schools in Arizona
Public middle schools in Arizona
Schools in Tucson, Arizona
1986 establishments in Arizona